Susan Brodrick is a British actress who was active between 1966 and 1971. She was best known for acting in Blowup (1966) and Private Road (1971).

References

External links 
 

English actresses
1945 births
Living people